Windows is the twelfth studio album by Charlie Daniels and the ninth as the Charlie Daniels Band, released on March 5, 1982.

Track listing
All songs composed by the Charlie Daniels Band (Charlie Daniels, Tom Crain, Taz DiGregorio, Fred Edwards, Charles Hayward & James W. Marshall), except where indicated:

   "Still in Saigon" (Dan Daley) - 3:51
   "Ain't No Ramblers Anymore" - 3:55
   "The Lady in Red" (DiGregorio, Clare Michelle DiGregorio) - 3:32
   "We Had It All One Time" (Daniels) - 4:38
   "Partyin' Gal" - 3:33
   "Ragin' Cajun" - 4:10
   "Makes You Want to Go Home" - 4:30
   "Blowing Along With the Wind" - 4:52
   "Nashville Moon" (Crain) - 3:30
   "The Universal Hand" - 3:48

Chart performance

Album

Singles

References

1982 albums
Charlie Daniels albums
Albums produced by John Boylan (record producer)
Epic Records albums